The lesser false fritillary (Anetia briarea) is a species of butterfly in the Danainae subfamily. It is found in Cuba, the Dominican Republic, and Haiti.

References

Anetia
Taxonomy articles created by Polbot
Butterflies described in 1819